Club Athletico Paranaense (commonly known as Athletico Paranaense and formerly known as Atlético Paranaense) is a Brazilian football team from the city of Curitiba, capital city of the Brazilian state of Paraná, founded on March 26, 1924. The team won the Campeonato Brasileiro Série A, Brazil's top football division, in 2001, the Copa Sudamericana in 2018 and 2021, and the Copa do Brasil in 2019.

They are considered the strongest team in Brazil outside of the Big 12, at times even surpassing them.

History
The club was founded in 1924 through the merger of International Football Club and América Futebol Clube, two traditional clubs in Curitiba.

The club's first match, a friendly one, was played on April 6, when Athletico Paranaense beat Universal FC 4–2.

Athletico Paranaense has participated in the Copa Libertadores, in 2000, 2002, 2005, 2014, 2017, 2019, 2020 and 2022. In 2005 and 2022, Athletico Paranaense was the runner-up of the competition being defeated in the finals by São Paulo and Flamengo respectively.

A survey taken in 2005 by Paraná Pesquisas Institute showed that Athletico Paranaense has the largest number of supporters in Curitiba.

In 2006 and 2018, Club Athletico Paranaense had a good performance in the Copa Sudamericana, reaching the semifinals after defeating high-profile teams like Argentina's River Plate and Uruguay's Nacional. They finally won the competition in 2018 defeating Colombia's Junior in the final.

In 2007, the team partnered with the American MLS club FC Dallas. In 2010 they also announced a partnership with Vitesse Arnhem in the Netherlands. 

On 15 February 2015, the club signed Indian winger Romeo Fernandes on loan from Dempo and through this contract he became the first and only Indian footballer to play in a South American top-tier league. Zico, then FC Goa coach played a key role behind this contract.

Team colors and uniform

Originally in 1924 Athletico used to play using a horizontally striped in red and black shirt, along with white shorts and red and black socks. 

In 1989 Athletico's administrators wanted to differentiate the team's uniform from the other red and black teams in Brazil (mainly speaking of Flamengo, Sport Recife and Vitória), so they changed the home shirt to be vertically striped in red and black (the team kept playing with white socks and white shorts). In 1996 Athletico changed the color of the socks and the shorts from white to black. 

In December 2018, Athletico's administrators changed the club's crest to be four alternating red and black diagonal stripes which decreased in size from top to bottom, resembling a hurricane, echoing the club's nickname. The club also changed their name from 'Clube Atlético Paranaense' to its original name in the Portuguese orthography when it was founded, 'Club Athletico Paranaense', which some believe to be a move in order to further differentiate themselves from Atlético Mineiro, another prominent Brazilian club. The club also changed the kits: the home kit, which had been a red and black vertically striped shirt, black shorts and black socks for twenty-two years became a predominantly red shirt, with a black collar, and the four diagonal stripes from the crest enlarged and going across both the front and back of the lower third of the shirt in black. The shorts and socks remain black. The away strip released with this kit was a white shirt with a black collar. In place of the four diagonal stripes were eight thin diagonal lines in the place of the outline of the larger ones seen on the home shirt; these too were black. The shorts and socks were white.

Stadium

The home stadium is the Estádio Joaquim Américo Guimarães, built in 1914 and renovated several times is traditionally known as Arena da Baixada. Besides hosting important club games, Arena da Baixada also hosted 4 World Cup games in 2014 and other events like the 2017 FIVB Volleyball World League, the UFC 198: Werdum vs. Miocic and many music concerts.
Arena da Baixada is also the only stadium in South America with a retractable roof and was the first to use artificial turf (with FIFA approval).

Partnerships
 Orlando City SC (MLS) – The technical partnership connects City with a club with a training facility and one of Brazil's academies.
 All India Football Federation (AIFF) – On 13 November 2014, Paranaense signed a partnership with AIFF, the governing body of Indian football, on a contract lasting till the end of 2015. The idea was presented by Technical director Rob Baan. Its main motive would be to help India for "development of a strong Indian side in the 2017 FIFA U-17 World Cup.

Current squad

First team

Under-23 squad

Other players

Out on loan

Personnel

Current technical staff

 Last updated: 24 February 2023
 Source:

Management

 Last updated: December 28, 2019
 Source:

Honours

International 
 Copa Libertadores
Runner-up (2): 2005, 2022
 Copa Sudamericana
Winner (2): 2018, 2021

 J.League Cup / Copa Sudamericana Championship

Winner (1): 2019

National
Série A
Winners: 2001

Copa do Brasil
Winners: 2019
Runners-up: 2013, 2021

Seletiva Libertadores*
Winners: 1999

Note: Seletiva para a Libertadores is not considered an official title, as the criterion for participation in it was the elimination of clubs in the Brazilian Championship, that is, it "rewarded failure" of participants in another competition.

Série B
Winners: 1995

Regional
Campeonato Paranaense
Winners (26): 1925, 1929, 1930, 1934, 1936, 1940, 1943, 1945, 1949, 1958, 1970, 1982, 1983, 1985, 1988, 1990, 1998, 2000, 2001, 2002, 2005, 2009, 2016, 2018, 2019, 2020

Other
Copa Paraná
Winners (2): 1998, 2003

History in competitions

(*): Not participated

South American Record

Head coaches

 Noah Jegat (1979), (1983)
 Otacílio Gonçalves (1985–86)
 Nicanor de Carvalho (1986)
 Nelsinho Baptista (1987–88)
 Paulo Emilio (1993)
 Procópio Cardoso (1993)
 Hélio dos Anjos (1994)
 Pepe (1995)
 Émerson Leão (1996)
 Cabralzinho (1996)
 Evaristo de Macedo (1996)
 Jair Pereira (1997)
 Émerson Leão (1997–98)
 Abel Braga (1998)
 João Carlos (1998)
 Vadão (1999–00)
 Arthur Neto (2000)
 Antônio Lopes (2000)
 Paulo César Carpegiani (2001)
 Mário Sérgio (2001)
 Geninho (2001–02)
 Valdir Espinosa (2002)
 Abel Braga (2002)
 Vadão (2003)
 Mário Sérgio (2003–04)
 Levir Culpi (2004)
 Casemiro Mior (2005)
 Edinho (2005)
 Antônio Lopes (2005)
 Evaristo de Macedo (2005)
 Lothar Matthäus (2006)
 Givanildo Oliveira (2006)
 Vadão (2006–07)
 Antônio Lopes (2007)
 Ney Franco (2007–08)
 Roberto Fernandes (2008)
 Tico (interim) (2008)
 Mário Sérgio (2008)
 Geninho (2008–09)
 Waldemar Lemos (2009)
 Antônio Lopes (2009–10)
 Leandro Niehues (2010)
 Paulo César Carpegiani (2010)
 Sérgio Soares (2010–11)
 Geninho (2011)
 Adilson Batista (2011)
 Renato Gaúcho (2011)
 Antônio Lopes (2011)
 Juan Ramón Carrasco (2012)
 Ricardo Drubscky (interim) (2012)
 Jorginho (2012)
 Ricardo Drubscky (2012–13)
 Vagner Mancini (2013)
 Miguel Ángel Portugal (2014)
 Leandro Ávila (interim) (2014)
 Doriva (2014)
 Leandro Ávila (interim) (2014)
 Claudinei Oliveira (2014–15)
 Enderson Moreira (2015)
 Milton Mendes (2015)
 Sérgio Vieira (interim) (2015)
 Cristóvão Borges (2015–16)
 Paulo Autuori (2016–17)
 Eduardo Baptista (2017)
 Fabiano Soares (2017)
 Fernando Diniz (2018)
 Tiago Nunes (2018–2019)
 Eduardo Barros (interim) (2019)
 Dorival Júnior (2020)
 Eduardo Barros (interim) (2019)
 Paulo Autuori (2020–2021)
 António Oliveira (2021)
 Paulo Autuori (interim) (2021)
 Alberto Valentim (2021–2022)

References

External links

 Official Site 
 Unofficial Site  
 List of all matches played

 
Football clubs in Paraná (state)
Association football clubs established in 1924
Sport in Curitiba
1924 establishments in Brazil
Athletico
Copa do Brasil winning clubs
Campeonato Brasileiro Série A winning clubs